Alexander Leonidovich Kaidanovsky (23 July 1946 — 3 December 1995) was a Soviet and Russian actor and film director.

His best known roles are in films such as At Home Among Strangers (1974), The Bodyguard  (1979) and Stalker (1979).

Prior to pursuing an acting career, Kaidanovsky attended technical college where he was training to become a welder. In 1965 he started studying acting at The Rostov Theatre School and the Schukin Institute in Moscow. Before completing the course he took his first part in the film The Mysterious Wall (1967) and upon graduation in 1969, he worked as stage actor.

In 1985 he directed A Simple Death, which was screened in the Un Certain Regard section at the 1987 Cannes Film Festival.

Kaidanovsky made his theatre debut at the Vakhtangov Theatre in 1969. In 1971 he was invited to join   the Moscow Arts Theatre, the best classical theatre in Russia, a rare privilege for a 25-year-old graduate.

He made his major film debut in At Home Among Strangers (1974), and over the next few years appeared in some two dozen films, including the satirical comedy Diamonds for Dictatorship of the Proletariat (1976) and The Life of Beethoven (1980). At his peak in the '70s Kaidanovsky was among Soviet Russia's most popular actors, and it was at this point that famed Soviet director Andrei Tarkovsky, impressed by the looks and the acting technique of Kaidanovsky in Diamonds, invited him to play the title-role in his new film, Stalker (1979). This role earned Kaidanovsky international acclaim.

Selected filmography

Anna Karenina (1967) as Jules Lando
The Mysterious Wall (1967) as Someone
Red Square (1970) as Kashchei
 The Hound of the Baskervilles (1971) as Stapleton
Investigation Held by ZnaToKi (1972, TV) as Mirkin
The Fourth (1972) as navigating officer
Failure of Engineer Garin (1973, TV Mini-Series) as Wolf 
At Home Among Strangers (1974) as Lemke, rittmeister
The Lost Expedition (1975) as Zimin
Diamonds for the Dictatorship of the Proletariat (1975) as Vorontsov
Inquest of Pilot Pirx (1979) as Tom Nowak
Stalker (1979) as Stalker
Telokhranitel (1979) as Bodyguard
The Lifeguard (1980) as  Varaksin
Rafferty (1980, TV Movie) as prosecutor Ames
Faktas (1981) as Stanislav
Atsiprasau (1982) as Pranas
Khareba da Gogia (1987) as Volkhovski
And Then There Were None (1987) as Captain Philip Lombard
New Adventures of a Yankee in King Arthur's Court (1988) as Sir Lancelot
Kerosene Salesman's Wife (1988) as Vasily Petrovich (voice) 
Songlines  Segment: For a Million (1989, director) 
Magic Hunter (1994) as Maxim

References

External links
 
 Alexander Kaidanovsky: articles, filmography and photos (Archived 2009-10-25) 

1946 births
1995 deaths
Actors from Rostov-on-Don
Russian male actors
Soviet male actors
Jewish Russian actors
High Courses for Scriptwriters and Film Directors alumni
Academic staff of High Courses for Scriptwriters and Film Directors
Russian film directors
Soviet film directors
Burials at Kuntsevo Cemetery
Film people from Rostov-on-Don